LRA Radio Nacional, also known as Radio Nacional Argentina, is the Argentine national radio station, and part of the national public media system. It started transmitting in 1937 as LRA Radio del Estado and changed its name to the current one in 1957. Since 1949, National Radio is also in charge of the Radiodifusión Argentina al Exterior, an international service that broadcasts in numerous languages.

The radio's programs focus on Argentine news, and culture, and history, among other things. Music broadcast  includes all kind of Argentine songs - from Folklore to Tango and Argentine Rock.
Aside from the main news broadcasts and cultural shows, RNA also broadcasts national football matches and the performance of other Argentine athletes during venues such as the Olympic Games or the FIFA World Cup.

Availability 
The head of the radio system is located in Buenos Aires, and has several transmission points that re-transmit the original signal, but also produce their own programs:

LRA1 Radio Nacional de Buenos Aires
LRA2 Viedma, Río Negro Province
LRA3 Santa Rosa, La Pampa Province
LRA4 Salta, Salta Province
LRA5 Rosario, Santa Fe Province
LRA6 Mendoza, Mendoza Province
LRA7 Córdoba, Córdoba Province
LRA8 Formosa Formosa Province
LRA9 Esquel, Chubut Province
LRA10 Ushuaia, Tierra del Fuego Province
LRA11 Comodoro Rivadavia, Chubut Province
LRA12 Santo Tomé, Corrientes Province
LRA13 Bahía Blanca, Buenos Aires Province
LRA14 Santa Fe, Santa Fe Province
LRA15 Tucumán, Tucumán Province
LRA16 La Quiaca, Jujuy Province
LRA17 Zapala, Neuquén Province
LRA18 Río Turbio, Córdoba Province
LRA19 Puerto Iguazú, Misiones Province
LRA20 Las Lomitas, Jujuy Province
LRA21 Santiago del Estero, Santiago del Estero Province
LRA22 Jujuy, Jujuy Province
LRA23 San Juan, San Juan Province
LRA24 Río Grande Tierra del Fuego Province
LRA25 Tartagal, Salta Province
LRA26 Resistencia, Chaco Province
LRA27 Catamarca Catamarca Province
LRA28 La Rioja La Rioja Province
LRA29 San Luis San Luis Province
LRA30 Bariloche, Río Negro Province
LRA31 Radio RAE de Buenos Aires
LRA36 Arcángel San Gabriel - Esperanza Base, Argentine Antarctica
LRA42 Gualeguaychú, Entre Ríos Province
LRA51 Jachal, San Juan Province
LRA52 Chos Malal, Neuquén Province
LRA53 San Martín de los Andes, Neuquén Province
LRA54 Ingeniero Jacobacci, Río Negro Province
LRA55 Alto Río Senguer, Chubut Province
LRA56 Perito Moreno, Santa Cruz Province
LRA57 El Bolsón, Río Negro Province
LRA58 Río Mayo, Chubut Province
LRA59 Gobernador Gregores, Santa Cruz Province
LRA343 Neuquén, Neuquén Province
LRA339 FM Folklórica de Buenos Aires
LT11 Concepción del Uruguay, Entre Ríos Province
LT12 Paso de los Libres, Corrientes Province
LT14 Paraná, Entre Ríos Province
LU4 Comodoro Rivadavia, Chubut Province
LU23 El Calafate, Santa Cruz Province
LV4 San Rafael, Mendoza Province
LV8 Mendoza, Mendoza Province
LV19 Malargüe, Mendoza Province

External links

 

Radio stations in Argentina
Mass media companies of Argentina